Hurdle rate may refer to

a minimum acceptable rate of return on a project 
a level of return that a hedge fund must exceed before it can charge a performance fee

Rates

it:Hurdle rate